Amma Adomaa Twum-Amoah is a Ghanaian diplomat who has worked for the Foreign relations of Ghana in various capacities and presently Ghana's Ambassador to Ethiopia. She became Minister/Head of Chancery of the Embassy of Ghana in Washington, D.C. in the United States on November 17, 2012.

Career 

Amma previously served in key civil service and government positions in Ghana and held a diplomatic post in Australia as Minister-Counsellor/Acting High Commissioner, for Ghana High Commission at Canberra in Australia from October 2005 to February 2006.

During her work in Australia, she led a team of four Officers to reopen Ghana’s High Commission in Canberra and represented the Government of Ghana in Australia until the arrival of a substantive High Commissioner in March 2006 in the person of His Excellency Mr. Kofi Sekyiamah.

The Ghanaian Diplomat served as Counsellor/Head of Chancery for the Ghana Permanent Mission to the United Nations in Geneva, Switzerland from September 2000 to August 2002. In Geneva Amma served as a member of the delegation for Ghana presenting a report on human rights discrimination. She was part of the team that presented the report of the Ninth Meeting of the Programme Coordinating Board of the Joint United Nations Programme on HIV/AIDS, Geneva, in May 2000.

Twum-Amoah has served the peoples of Ghana too in the following capacities: Deputy Director of Policy Planning and Research Bureau at the Ministry of Foreign Affairs in Accra from  October 2004 to October 2005 during which she processed requests for agreement for new Envoys to Ghana among other tasks until September 2002 to March 2003 when she became the acting director for that Ministry.

Twum-Amoah served as acting Head of Mission for the embassy from February 1, 2014, to October 16, 2014, before Lieutenant General Joseph Henry Smith was named Ghana Ambassador to the USA.

Twum-Amoah served in Ghana as the Director of Protocol Bureau for the Ministry of Foreign Affairs and Regional Integration from June 2011 to November 2012. Twum-Amoah currently serves as Ghana's Ambassador to Ethiopia.

She hosted Ghana President John Dramani Mahama when he attended the United States–Africa Leaders Summit in 2014 as Acting Ambassador. It was during that time too that the Ghana national football team visited the USA on their way to the2014 FIFA World Cup in Brazil.

Twum-Amoah currently also serves as head of Ghana's Permanent Mission to the African Union.

Personal life
Twum-Amoah is currently married to Paul Amoah and has three children: Papa Amoah, Maame Amoah, and Ewuradjoa Amoah.

See also 
 Foreign relations of Ghana
List of Ambassadors and High Commissioners of Ghana

References 

Living people
Alumni of the University of Oxford
Year of birth missing (living people)
Ghanaian women ambassadors
Ambassadors of Ghana to Ethiopia
University of Cape Coast alumni
Ghanaian diplomats